Michel Mathiot (23 August 1926 – 2 February 1999) was a French gymnast. He competed at the 1948, 1952, 1956 and the 1960 Summer Olympics.

References

1926 births
1999 deaths
French male artistic gymnasts
Olympic gymnasts of France
Gymnasts at the 1948 Summer Olympics
Gymnasts at the 1952 Summer Olympics
Gymnasts at the 1956 Summer Olympics
Gymnasts at the 1960 Summer Olympics
Sportspeople from Besançon
20th-century French people